AArt is the eleventh album to be released by smooth jazz band Acoustic Alchemy. It contains more tracks than any other studio recording by the band, with fourteen.

Continuing on from the radical changes enforced by The Beautiful Game, AArt follows precedent with another varied mix of styles and genres, and even calls upon saxophonist Jeff Kashiwa, formerly of The Rippingtons, to share the lead on one track, "AArt Attack".

"The Velvet Swing" managed to achieve daytime radio play on London's 102.2 Jazz FM.

Track listing

Singles
"Wish You Were Near"

Notes

Acoustic Alchemy albums
2001 albums